Cheiridea is a genus of leaf beetles in the subfamily Eumolpinae. It contains only one species, Cheiridea chapuisi, found in Sierra Leone. It was first described by Joseph Sugar Baly in 1878.

"Chiridea" is an alternative spelling of the genus name sometimes used; it is a Latinized version of the name "Cheiridea" created by Kuntzen in 1912, who considered the original name to be unlatinated.

References

Eumolpinae
Monotypic Chrysomelidae genera
Insects of West Africa
Taxa named by Joseph Sugar Baly
Endemic fauna of Sierra Leone
Arthropods of Sierra Leone